Dulcie Elaine Tei is a Tongan politician and Member of the Legislative Assembly of Tonga. She is the wife of former Deputy Prime Minister Poasi Tei.

She was first elected to Parliament in the 2022 Tongatapu 7 by-election, succeeding her husband who had been unseated for corruption.

References

Living people
Members of the Legislative Assembly of Tonga
Year of birth missing (living people)